Mamamia Show is an Indonesian singing contest reality television show broadcast on the Indonesian TV channel Indosiar.

Despite similarities, Mamamia Show is not a licensed version of the Idols format distributed by FremantleMedia.

Four seasons of Mamamia Show have been aired in Indonesia (2007, 2008, 2010, and 2014–2015).

References 

Indonesian reality television series